Orestes Araújo (Mahón, 1853 - Montevideo, 1915) was a Uruguayan lecturer, schoolteacher and historian.

Born in Menorca, he settled in Montevideo in 1870 and worked in the newspaper La Paz, established by José Pedro Varela. Araújo helped him and his brother Jacobo in the implementation of a school reform, task which he undertook until 1889.

He wrote several didactic and reference works:
 Diccionario Geográfico del Uruguay (1900) 
 Historia de la Escuela Uruguaya (1911)

References

1853 births
1915 deaths
People from Mahón
Uruguayan male writers
20th-century Uruguayan historians
19th-century Uruguayan educators
20th-century Uruguayan educators